Youssef Rzouga is a Tunisian writer and poet, born on March 21, 1957 in Zorda, Tunisia.  He began writing in 1967. His first published text was "Something called need," a short story in the magazine Radio et Télévision (1973).

Education 
Primary:
Rzouga studied at the School of Zorda in Sidi Alouane.

Secondary:
He continued his education at Ksour Essef secondary school and the school of Sousse.

University degrees:

Master’s Degree in Journalism and information sciences (Political sciences).
Diploma in Russian language from the Faculty Patrice Lumumba, Moscow.
Postgraduate Diploma in Political sciences from the Faculté des droits et des sciences politiques of Tunis.
Theories of art and aesthetics Postgraduate Diploma, from the Institut supérieur de Beaux-arts of Tunis.
Postgraduate Diploma, journalism and information sciences.

Career
Editor of El-Amal, a daily paper (1980-1982)
From 1982-1987 he was the Chief Editor of the Ministry of Culture's magazine Ach’er (La poésie)
Editor of the daily paper Elhoria (1987-1989)
Chief editor of the Aljil Aljadid magazine (1990-1992)
Since 1989, Rzouga has been the Chief editor of the literary supplement Warakat Thakafiya of the Tunisian daily paper Essahafa.

Honours and awards
Rzouga has been achieved several awards, including the Tunisian Ministry of Culture award 3 times:
1981: Award of the ministry of Culture for his poetic book I’m distinguished from you by my grievances
1986: Award of the ministry of Culture for his poetic book The program of the rose.
1999: Award of the ministry of Culture for his poetic book The Wolf in the Word.
2000: National merit award in the cultural field
2002: Youssef Rzouga Award of Poetry (A yearly Poetic Prize started in 2002, awarded to the best young poet within the framework of The Meeting of Greater on literary creation).
2003: Aboulkacem Chebbi Prize for his poetic book: Flowers of Dioxyde of History.
2003: The Pen of the Poet Youssef Rzouga (A yearly Poetic Prize started in July 2003 in Sidi Alouan).
2004: Prize of the gouvernorat of Mahdia for his poetic book: Emergency Case Declaration.
2004: King Abdallah II’s creativity Prize / Jordan.
President of the club Mercredi littéraire in Tunis since 1988.
Member of the Union of Tunisian Writers
Member of the Union of Arab Writers
Member of the Tunisian Association of Journalists

Works
Youssef Rzouga has written many poems and prose pieces:
I'm distinguished from you by my grievances (1979)
The program of the Rose (1985)
The Astrolabe of Youssef the traveler (1986)
The Wolf in the Word (1998)
The Country Between the Hands (2001)
Flowers of Dioxyde of History (2001)
Emergency Case Declaration (2002)
The Butterfly and the Dynamite (2004)
Yogana (The Book of Poetic Yoga) (2004)
Poetical Works (Volume I)... (2003)

Critical reviews

The Garden and its surroundings (Aspects of the career of the poet Youssef Rzouga, 224 pages) By: Khaled Mejri and Chawki Anizi
Globalization and poetic Language in Flowers of Dioxyde of History by Maher Derbel and Abderrazek Kolsi.
The Troubadour of Modern Times, edited by Walid Soliman.
The Half-open Door, by Hafedh Mahfoudh.
Down with the mask, by Chamseddine Ouni.
The orchestra of the poet in Emergency Case Declaration by Houyem Ferchichi.

References

1957 births
20th-century Tunisian poets
Living people
21st-century Tunisian poets